Federally funded research and development centers (FFRDCs) are public-private partnerships that conduct research and development for the United States Government. Under Federal Acquisition Regulation § 35.017, FFRDCs are operated by universities and corporations to fulfill certain long-term needs of the government that "...cannot be met as effectively by existing in-house or contractor resources." While similar in many ways to University Affiliated Research Centers, FFRDCs are prohibited from competing for work. There are currently 42 FFRDCs, each sponsored by one or more U.S. government departments or agencies.

History
During World War II scientists, engineers, mathematicians, and other specialists became part of the United States massive war effort—leading to evolutions in radar, aircraft, computing and, most famously, the development of nuclear weapons through the Manhattan Project. The end of armed conflict did not end the need for organized research and development in support of the government.

As the Cold War became the new reality, government officials and their scientific advisors advanced the idea of a systematic approach to research, development, and acquisitions—one independent of the ups and downs of the marketplace and free of the restrictions on civil service. From this idea arose the concept of FFRDCs—private entities that would work almost exclusively on behalf of the government—free of organizational conflicts of interest and with a stable workforce of highly trained technical talent.

The U.S. Air Force created the first FFRDC, the RAND Corporation, in 1947. Others grew directly out of their wartime roles. For example, MIT Lincoln Laboratory, founded in 1951, originated as the Radiation Laboratory at MIT, and the Navy's Operation Research Group evolved into the Center for Naval Analyses. The first FFRDCs served the Department of Defense. Since then, other government organizations have sponsored FFRDCs to meet their specific needs. In 1969, the number of FFRDCs peaked at 74.

List

The following list includes all current FFRDCs:

References

Further reading 
 
 

1947 establishments in the United States
 
United States science-related lists